Chris Lee (born October 3, 1980) is a Canadian former professional ice hockey defenceman who last played with Metallurg Magnitogorsk in the Kontinental Hockey League (KHL), where he won the Gagarin Cup in 2014 and 2016.

Lee represented his country at the 2017 IIHF World Championship, and the 2018 Winter Olympics; winning a silver and bronze medal respectively.

Playing career
Undrafted, Lee played 249 regular-season games in the American Hockey League for the Albany River Rats, Omaha Ak-Sar-Ben Knights, Iowa Stars, Bridgeport Sound Tigers., and Wilkes-Barre/Scranton Penguins.

He played the 2011–12 season with Adler Mannheim in the Deutsche Eishockey Liga (DEL). For the 2011–12 DEL season, Lee won the Defenceman of the Year award. He played in the  Elitserien with Färjestad BK for the 2012–13 season.

After a successful first season in 2013–14 helping Russian club Metallurg Magnitogorsk claim the Gagarin Cup, Lee was signed to a three-year contract extension on October 16, 2014. He helped the team recapture the championship in 2016, whilst also leading all defenceman in playoff scoring with 13 points (tied with Nikita Zaitsev and Sami Lepistö).

International play

Lee originally represented a European-based Team Canada at the Deutschland Cup in 2013 and 2017. During the 2017 IIHF World Championship, Lee was added to the Canada roster after a freak injury suffered by fellow defenceman Tyson Barrie at the team hotel. He made his full international debut with Canada, contributing an assist in a 3–2 victory over host team France on May 11, 2017; Canada went on to win the silver medal losing to Sweden in the gold medal game.

Lee played for Canada at the 2018 Winter Olympics. where they won a bronze medal.

Career statistics

Regular season and playoffs

International

Awards and honours

References

External links

1980 births
Living people
Adler Mannheim players
Albany River Rats players
Bridgeport Sound Tigers players
Canadian ice hockey defencemen
Färjestad BK players
Florida Everblades players
Ice hockey people from Ontario
Iowa Stars players
Kölner Haie players
Metallurg Magnitogorsk players
Omaha Ak-Sar-Ben Knights players
State University of New York at Potsdam alumni
Wilkes-Barre/Scranton Penguins players
Olympic ice hockey players of Canada
Ice hockey players at the 2018 Winter Olympics
Olympic bronze medalists for Canada
Medalists at the 2018 Winter Olympics
Olympic medalists in ice hockey
Canadian expatriate ice hockey players in Germany
Canadian expatriate ice hockey players in Russia
Canadian expatriate ice hockey players in Sweden